Paulus Natangwe Ambunda (born 6 August 1980) is a Namibian boxer who participated in the 2004 Summer Olympics. As a professional, he held the WBO bantamweight title in 2013, and twice the IBO bantamweight title in 2015 and in 2018.

Amateur career
Ambunda won the silver medal at flyweight at the 2004 All-Africa Games in Abuja, Nigeria. At the 2004 Summer Olympics he was stopped in the quarter finals of the flyweight (51 kg) division by Germany's eventual bronze medal winner Rustamhodza Rahimov.

Professional career
Ambunda won the WBO bantamweight title against Thai fighter Pungluang Sor Singyu in his 20th fight. he would end up losing the belt in his first defense to Japanese fighter Tomoki Kameda.

Professional boxing record

See also
List of bantamweight boxing champions

References

External links

1980 births
Living people
bantamweight boxers
super-bantamweight boxers
World bantamweight boxing champions
World Boxing Organization champions
International Boxing Organization champions
Sportspeople from Swakopmund
Namibian male boxers
Olympic boxers of Namibia
Boxers at the 2004 Summer Olympics
African Games silver medalists for Namibia
African Games medalists in boxing
Competitors at the 2003 All-Africa Games